Sweep or swept may refer to:

Cleaning
 Sweep, the action of using a brush to clean
 Chimney sweep, a worker who clears ash and soot from chimneys
 Street sweeper, a person's occupation, or a machine that cleans streets
 Swept quartz, a cleaning of quartz crystal from alkali metal ions

Arts, entertainment, and media
 Sweep (book series), a fictional series by Cate Tiernan
 Sweep (puppet), a character on the British children's television series The Sooty Show
 Sweep, an ability keyword in Magic: The Gathering
 Sweep-picking, a guitar technique
 Sweeps period, a system of calculating viewership for television programming
 Swept (album), a 1991 album by the English singer Julia Fordham

Detection
 Bug sweeping, the common name for electronic counter surveillance
 Minesweeper (ship), a small naval ship designed to engage in minesweeping
 Minesweeping, the practice of removing explosive mines
 Radio-frequency sweep, the action of scanning a radio frequency band for detecting signals transmitted there
 SWEEPS, a 2006 astronomical survey project using the Hubble Space Telescope

Farming
 Sweep (agricultural), a row crop cultivator
 SWEEP (Soil and Water Environmental Enhancement program), a Canadian agricultural program 1986–1988

People with the name
 Shaun Wright-Phillips, a football player nicknamed Sweep

Sports 
 Sweep (American football), a running play in American football

 Packers sweep, a running play popularized by Vince Lombardi and the Green Bay Packers
 Sweep (martial arts), the name used for two categories of martial arts techniques
 Sweep (rowing), a rowing technique
 Sweep shot, a shot played in cricket
 Whitewash (sport) or sweep, winning a series or contest without any losses
 Curling involves sweeping on ice

Other meanings
 Sweep (fish), a number of fish in the suborder Scorpidinae
 Sweep (horse) (1907–1936), champion Thoroughbred race horse
 Sweep (motorcycle), in group motorcycle riding, the last rider in line
 Sweep (software), a digital audio editor
 Sweep, a gradual bend or elbow, in conduit, ductwork, piping, or other tubing
 Well sweep, an irrigation tool
 Sweep account, a kind of bank account
 Sweep line algorithm, a concept in computational geometry
 Sweeps, a regional English term for windmill sails
 Sweepstakes, a sales promotion or lottery
 Swept wing, a layout of the wings on an airplane

See also
 Sweeps (disambiguation)
 Broom
 Clean sweep (disambiguation)
 Mop